Dursun is a masculine Turkish given name, it may refer to:

Given name
 Dursun Karataş (1952–2008), Turkish communist
 Dursun Karatay (born 1984), Austrian footballer
 Dursun Sevinç (born 1972), Turkish weightlifter

Surname
 Adem Dursun (born 1979), Turkish footballer
 Ahmet Dursun (born 1978), Turkish footballer
 Özlem Ceren Dursun (born 2003), Turkish female cross-country skier
 Peter Dursun (born 1975), Danish former footballer
 Salih Dursun (born 1991), Turkish footballer
 Serdar Dursun (born 1991), Turkish footballer
 Turan Dursun (1934–1990), Turkish Islamic scholar

Turkish-language surnames
Turkish masculine given names